L. G. Sherman Tobacco Warehouse is a historic tobacco warehouse located at Lancaster, Lancaster County, Pennsylvania. It was built about 1900, and is a two-story, rectangular brick building with a high basement.  It is eight bays wide by two bays, and has a flat roof. It is a few doors from the R. K. Schnader & Sons Tobacco Warehouse. It has been converted to residential use.

It was listed on the National Register of Historic Places in 1990.

References

Industrial buildings and structures on the National Register of Historic Places in Pennsylvania
Industrial buildings completed in 1900
Buildings and structures in Lancaster, Pennsylvania
Tobacco buildings in the United States
National Register of Historic Places in Lancaster, Pennsylvania